The Memorial Romano Scotti is a cyclo-cross race held in Rome, Italy. Its first edition was on 9 January 2011 as the Italian National Championship. It was held a second time in December of that year. Since the 2012–2013 season, it is part of the UCI Cyclo-cross World Cup. The event is named after Italian cyclist Romano Scotti.

Results

Men

Women

References

External links
 
 

Cyclo-cross races
UCI Cyclo-cross World Cup
Cycle races in Italy
2011 establishments in Italy
Recurring sporting events established in 2011
Sports competitions in Rome